The 1993 NCAA Division II football season, part of college football in the United States organized by the National Collegiate Athletic Association at the Division II level, began in August 1993, and concluded with the NCAA Division II Football Championship on December 11, 1993, at Braly Municipal Stadium in Florence, Alabama, hosted by the University of North Alabama.

North Alabama defeated  in the championship game, 41–34, to win their first Division II national title.

The Harlon Hill Trophy was awarded to Roger Graham, running back from New Haven.

Conference changes and new programs

Conference changes
A 1991 NCAA rule change required athletic programs maintain all of their sports at the same division level by the 1993 season. As such, many Division I programs with football teams at the Division II levels were forced to upgrade their programs to Division I-AA. As such, a large number of teams departed Division II after the 1992 season.
After losing four of its core members to this decision, the Western Football Conference was forced to dissolve before the season. Four of its members upgraded to Division I-AA while its remaining members either became Division II independents or dropped their football programs.
The West Virginia Intercollegiate Athletic Conference transitioned its entire membership from the NAIA to Division II prior to the season.

Program changes
After Texas A&I University joined the Texas A&M University System in 1989 and changed its name to Texas A&M University–Kingsville in 1993, the Texas A&I Javelinas became the Texas A&M–Kingsville Javelinas at the start of the 1993 season.
After West Texas State University joined the Texas A&M University System in 1989 and changed its name to West Texas A&M University in 1993, the West Texas State Buffaloes became the West Texas A&M Buffaloes at the start of the 1993 season.

Conference standings

Conference summaries

Postseason

The 1993 NCAA Division II Football Championship playoffs were the 21st single-elimination tournament to determine the national champion of men's NCAA Division II college football. The championship game was held at Braly Municipal Stadium in Florence, Alabama, for the eighth time.

Playoff bracket

See also
1993 NCAA Division I-A football season
1993 NCAA Division I-AA football season
1993 NCAA Division III football season
1993 NAIA Division I football season
1993 NAIA Division II football season

References